The Madhya Pradesh women's cricket team is an Indian domestic cricket team representing the Indian state of Madhya Pradesh. The team has represented the state in Women's Senior One Day Trophy (List A) and  Senior women's T20 league.

Honours
 Inter State Women's Competition:
 Runners-up (1): 2008–09

References

Cricket in Madhya Pradesh
Women's cricket teams in India